The Vodafone-Funkturm is a  tower for mobile phone services in Stuttgart-Vaihingen.

The tower is constructed from three concrete tubes which are assembled together in the form of a tripod. It was built in December 1998 in four days.

See also
 List of towers

External links
 
 http://www.skyscraperpage.com/diagrams/?b41614

Communication towers in Germany
Buildings and structures in Stuttgart
Vodafone buildings and structures
Towers completed in 1998
1998 establishments in Germany